Ella Barksdale Brown was an American anti-lynching advocate, activist, educator, suffragette and journalist. She was a member of the first graduating class of Spelman College in Atlanta, Georgia.

Life 
On June 22, 1871, in Milledgeville, Georgia, Ella Barksdale was born to Jefferson and Julia Lamar Barksdale, both former slaves. She attended college and was a student in the first graduating class from Spelman College in Atlanta, Georgia. After marrying John M. Brown in Georgia in 1898, she moved to Jersey City, New Jersey in 1901. John found a job there working for the Pullman Company. Together, Ella and John had four children: Marcia, Jefferson Barksdale, Mildred, and Miriam.

Work 
Brown was a journalist who wrote for The Chicago Defender and The New York Amsterdam News and was also a columnist for the Jersey Journal.

Besides writing, she was a well-known educator within the Jersey City high schools and surrounding community. She was given credit for introducing African-American studies into Jersey City public schools. The area schools and community organizations hosted her lectures on African American history due to her dedication to education. She was the first woman to be appointed to the Hudson County Board of Election.

Brown was most involved with the National Association for the Advancement of Colored People (NAACP), the Circle for Negro War Relief, the New Jersey Civil Rights Bureau, and the National Association of Colored Women. Her involvement in these organizations gained her recognition in community and national activist circles, which gained her personal connections with many leading civil rights and African American leaders including W.E.B. Dubois, Booker T. Washington, Paul Robeson, and James Weldon Johnson.

Along with her journalistic and educational achievements, Brown is credited with advocating for the New Jersey Federation to designate March 5th as Crispus Attucks day in New Jersey, which they did in 1949.

References

External links
 Ella Barksdale Brown Papers. Yale Collection of American Literature, Beinecke Rare Book and Manuscript Library.

1871 births
American women educators
American women journalists
Spelman College alumni
Year of death missing
African-American journalists